Brenda is a census-designated place (CDP) in La Paz County, Arizona, United States.

Description
Its population was 466 as of the 2020 census. Brenda is four miles northeast of the western terminus of US 60 (the last community on the highway westbound).

Demographics

Brenda first appeared on the 2010 U.S. Census as a census-designated place (CDP).

See also

 List of census-designated places in Arizona

References

External links

Census-designated places in La Paz County, Arizona